1 Chronicles 14 is the fourteenth chapter of the Books of Chronicles in the Hebrew Bible or the First Book of Chronicles in the Old Testament of the Christian Bible. The book is compiled from older sources by an unknown person or group, designated by modern scholars as "the Chronicler", and had the final shape established in late fifth or fourth century BCE. This chapter contains the successes of David as he established himself in Jerusalem and defeated the Philistines. The whole chapter belongs to the section focusing on the kingship of David (1 Chronicles 9:35 to 29:30).

Text
This chapter was originally written in the Hebrew language. It is divided into 17 verses.

Textual witnesses
Some early manuscripts containing the text of this chapter in Hebrew are of the Masoretic Text tradition, which includes the Aleppo Codex (10th century), and Codex Leningradensis (1008).

There is also a translation into Koine Greek known as the Septuagint, made in the last few centuries BCE. Extant ancient manuscripts of the Septuagint version include Codex Vaticanus (B; B; 4th century), Codex Sinaiticus (S; BHK: S; 4th century), Codex Alexandrinus (A; A; 5th century) and Codex Marchalianus (Q; Q; 6th century).

Old Testament references
: .
: .
: .

David Established at Jerusalem (14:1–7)
This passage emphasizes the greatness of David's reign for the sake of Israel after the transportation of the ark (whereas in 2 Samuel 5, the account was placed after the conquest of Jerusalem). The accumulation of wives and sons is seen as a 'positive sign of stature' in the books of Chronicles (1 Chronicles 25:5; 26:4–5; 2 Chronicles 11:18–23; 13:21; 14:3–7).

Verse 1
Now Hiram king of Tyre sent messengers to David, and cedar trees, with masons and carpenters, to build him a house.
Josephus cited Tyrian court records and the writings of Menander to write that Hiram lived for 53 years and reigned for 34 years, also that the construction of Solomon's Temple began in the twelfth year of Hiram's reign, which was 143 years before the building of Carthage. Hiram's good relation with David is noted in 1 Kings 5:15–26, which continued with Solomon after David's death, again as an equal (meaning "my brother"; ;).

David Defeats the Philistines (14:8–17)
The military successes had an astonishing effect of increasing David's fame (and name) internationally, denoting divine blessings for David.

Verse 11
So they went up to Baal Perazim, and David defeated them there. Then David said, “God has broken through my enemies by my hand like a breakthrough of water.” Therefore they called the name of that place Baal Perazim.
"Baal Perazim": literally, "Master of Breakthroughs." YHWH  'has burst out against' the place where the Philistines will be conquered just as he 'burst out against Uzzah' (1 Chronicles 13:11). The same verb "perez" is also used in 1 Chronicles 13:11 (three times) and 15:13 (cf. Exodus 19:22).

Verse 16
So David did as God commanded him, and they drove back the army of the Philistines from Gibeon as far as Gezer. 
 "Gibeon": written as "Geba"  in 2 Samuel 5:25 (following Masoretic, Targum, Syriac, and Arabic), but LXX (Septuagint) reads "Gibeon", which is supported by Isaiah 28:21. Both Gibeon and Geba (if this refers to another existing ancient city) were located north of Jerusalem, so both mentions may be correct, and each mean what it says.

See also

Related Bible parts: 2 Samuel 5, 1 Chronicles 3, 1 Chronicles 13, 1 Chronicles 15

References

Sources

External links
 Jewish translations:
 Divrei Hayamim I - I Chronicles - Chapter 14 (Judaica Press) translation [with Rashi's commentary] at Chabad.org
 Christian translations:
 Online Bible at GospelHall.org (ESV, KJV, Darby, American Standard Version, Bible in Basic English)
 First Book of Chronicles Chapter 14. Bible Gateway

14
Phoenicians in the Hebrew Bible